Cartmill is a surname. Notable people with the surname include:

Cleve Cartmill (1908–1964), American science-fiction and fantasy writer; father of Matt cartmill
Matt Cartmill (born 1943), American evolutionary anthropologist and editor; son of Cleve Cartmill
Tom Cartmill (born 1965), English painter